Ilmarinen most commonly refers to Seppo Ilmarinen, an archetypal artificer from Finnish mythology (Kalevala). Other uses of Ilmarinen include:

 Finnish coastal defence ship Ilmarinen
 Finnish icebreaker Ilmarinen
 Ilmarinen Mutual Pension Insurance Company
 the building of the Embassy of Finland to Australia

See also 
 Ilmari
 Silmaril